Leśno Górne  is a village in the administrative district of Gmina Police, within Police County, West Pomeranian Voivodeship, in north-western Poland, close to the German border.

History 

For the history of the region, see History of Pomerania.

References

Villages in Police County